Anthony David Mounce (born February 8, 1975) is a former Major League Baseball pitcher.

Mounce was originally selected by the Houston Astros in the 7th round of the 1994 Major League Baseball draft. Over the next five seasons, he worked his way up to the Astros' farm system as a starting pitcher. In , after having been converted into a relief pitcher, he made it to their Class AAA team, the New Orleans Zephyrs. He pitched 14 games (11 innings) with a 2.45 ERA, but was released by the Astros at the end of spring training, .

Mounce was signed by the Rangers on May 1, and they began his conversion back into a starter. After missing the entire  season, he once again started his climb up the organizational ladder, and by mid-2003 he had finally made it all the way to the major leagues, making his debut against the Florida Marlins in an interleague game, which the Rangers lost 8–0.

Mounce gained his lone major league win on July 3 against the Anaheim Angels. It was not a clear-cut victory, as Mounce gave up 3 runs on 6 hits in  innings, but the Rangers' bullpen held on for a 6–5 victory. Three weeks later, Mounce was sent back to the minors. He received a September call-up, pitching 3 more games, and was then released after the season.

External links

1975 births
Living people
Baseball players from Sacramento, California
Major League Baseball pitchers
Texas Rangers players
American expatriate baseball players in Japan
Yakult Swallows players
Gulf Coast Astros players
Quad Cities River Bandits players
Kissimmee Cobras players
New Orleans Zephyrs players
Jackson Generals (Texas League) players
Oklahoma RedHawks players
Tulsa Drillers players
Charlotte Rangers players
Savannah Sand Gnats players
Frisco RoughRiders players
Somerset Patriots players